Round of Applause may refer to:

"Round of Applause" (Waka Flocka Flame song), 2011
"Round of Applause" (Lecrae song), 2013